Boulenger's writhing skink (Mochlus productus) is a species of skink found in Somalia.

References

Mochlus
Reptiles described in 1909
Reptiles of Somalia
Endemic fauna of Somalia
Taxa named by George Albert Boulenger